Nicolette Hellemans (born 30 November 1961) is a former international rower from the Netherlands, who won the silver medal in the double sculls at the 1984 Summer Olympics, partnering with her elder sister Greet. At the same Olympics she also won a bronze medal in the coxed eights, alongside Marieke van Drogenbroek, Lynda Cornet, Harriet van Ettekoven, Greet Hellemans, Martha Laurijsen, Catharina Neelissen, Anne Quist and Wiljon Vaandrager.

References

1961 births
Living people
Dutch female rowers
Rowers at the 1984 Summer Olympics
Olympic rowers of the Netherlands
Medalists at the 1984 Summer Olympics
Olympic silver medalists for the Netherlands
Olympic bronze medalists for the Netherlands
Olympic medalists in rowing
Sportspeople from Groningen (city)
20th-century Dutch women
21st-century Dutch women